Events in the year 1757 in Norway.

Incumbents
Monarch: Frederick V

Events
Kongsberg School of Mines was established.

Arts and literature

Births
Syvert Amundsen Eeg, farmer and politician (died 1838)

Deaths

See also

References